Katelynn Phelan (born 22 May 2000) is an Irish professional boxer who has held the WBC Youth female and WIBA welterweight titles since October 2020. As an amateur she won a bronze medal at the 2017 Youth Women's World Championships.

Professional career
Phelan made her professional debut on 30 March 2019, scoring a four-round points decision (PTS) victory against Monika Antonik at the National Stadium in Dublin, Ireland.

After scoring two more wins, both by PTS, she faced Jessica Schadko for the vacant WIBA, WBC Youth female, and WBF female welterweight titles on 17 October 2020 at the CPI Box Club in Donauwörth, Germany. After five one sided rounds, Schadko's corner called a halt to the contest before the start of the round six, handing Phelan a fifth-round stoppage victory via corner retirement (RTD).

Her first fight of 2021 was a unanimous decision (UD) victory against Karina Kopinska on 20 March, in Dudelange, Luxembourg.

Professional boxing record

References

External links

Living people
2000 births
Irish women boxers
Light-welterweight boxers
Welterweight boxers
Women's International Boxing Association champions
21st-century Irish women